Tracey Duke is a former association football player who represented New Zealand at international level.

Duke made her Football Ferns début in a 0–1 loss to Bulgaria on 24 August 1994, and made just one further appearance, in a 0–3 loss to Ghana on 26 August that same year.

References

Year of birth missing (living people)
Living people
New Zealand women's international footballers
New Zealand women's association footballers
Women's association footballers not categorized by position